Selam is a tabia or municipality in the Dogu'a Tembien district of the Tigray Region of Ethiopia. The tabia centre is in Addi Werho village, located approximately 3 km to the northeast of the woreda town Hagere Selam.

Geography 
The tabia stretches down north of the ridge occupied by the main road towards the Tinsehe gorge. The highest peak is Imba Khoboro (2730 m a.s.l.) and the lowest place at the foot of the waterfall in Tinsehe (2000 m a.s.l.).

Geology 

From the higher to the lower locations, the following geological formations are present:
 Phonolite plugs
 Upper basalt
 Interbedded lacustrine deposits
 Lower basalt
 Amba Aradam Formation
 Antalo Limestone
 Quaternary alluvium and freshwater tufa

Geomorphology and soils 
The main geomorphic units, with corresponding soil types are:

Hagere Selam Highlands, along the upper basalt and sandstone ridge 
 Associated soil types 
 shallow soils with high stone contents (Skeletic Cambisol, Leptic Cambisol, Skeletic Regosol)
 moderately deep dark stony clays with good natural fertility (Vertic Cambisol)

 deep, dark cracking clays, temporarily waterlogged  during the wet season (Pellic Vertisol)
 Inclusions
 Rock outcrops and very shallow soils (Lithic Leptosol)
 Rock outcrops and very shallow soils on limestone (Calcaric Leptosol)
 Deep dark cracking clays with very good natural fertility, waterlogged during the wet season (Chromic Vertisol, Pellic Vertisol)
 Shallow stony dark loams on calcaric material (Calcaric Regosol, Calcaric Cambisol)
 Brown loamy soils on basalt with good natural fertility (Luvisol)

Gently rolling Antalo Limestone plateau (in the lower parts), holding cliffs and valley bottoms on limestone  
 Associated soil types
 shallow stony soils with a dark surface horizon overlying calcaric material (Calcaric Leptosol)
 moderately deep dark stony clays with good natural fertility (Vertic Cambisol)
 deep, dark cracking clays on calcaric material (Calcaric Vertisol, Calcic Vertisol)
 Inclusions
 Rock outcrops and very shallow soils (Lithic Leptosol)
 Shallow very stony loamy soil on limestone (Skeletic Calcaric Cambisol)
 Deep dark cracking clays with very good natural fertility, waterlogged during the wet season (Chromic Vertisol, Pellic Vertisol)
 Brown to dark sands and silt loams on alluvium (Vertic Fluvisol, Eutric Fluvisol, Haplic Fluvisol)

Climate and hydrology

Climate and meteorology 
The rainfall pattern shows a very high seasonality with 70 to 80% of the annual rain falling in July and August. Mean temperature in Addi Werho is 18.8 °C, oscillating between average daily minimum of 10.5 °C and maximum of 26.7 °C. The contrasts between day and night air temperatures are much larger than seasonal contrasts.

Rivers 
The Tsaliet River (a tributary to Weri’i River) is the most important rivers in the surroundings of the tabia. They flow towards Tekezze River and further on to the Nile. These rivers have incised deep gorges which characterise the landscape.
The drainage network of the tabia is organised as follows:
 Weri’i River basin
 May Leiba, in tabia Ayninbirkekin, which becomes Tinsehe R. in Selam and Mahbere Sillasie, and Tsaliet River, downstream from the Dabba Selama monastery
 May Meqa River, in tabia Selam
 Harehuwa River, in tabia Mahbere Sillasie
Whereas they are (nearly) dry during most of the year, during the main rainy season, these rivers carry high runoff discharges, sometimes in the form of flash floods. Especially at the begin of the rainy season they are brown-coloured, evidencing high soil erosion rates.

Springs 

As there are no permanent rivers, the presence of springs is of utmost importance for the local people. The main springs in the tabia are:
 May Gudgwad in Khunale
 May Miheno in Miheno

Water harvesting 
In this area with rains that last only for a couple of months per year, reservoirs of different sizes allow harvesting runoff from the rainy season for further use in the dry season. Overall they suffer from siltation. Yet, they strongly contribute to greening the landscape, either through irrigation or seepage water. Main reservoirs are:
 Traditional surface water harvesting ponds, particularly in places without permanent springs, called rahaya
 Horoyo, household ponds, recently constructed through campaigns

Settlements 
The tabia centre Addi Worho holds a few administrative offices, a health post, a primary school, and some small shops. There are a few more primary schools across the tabia. The main other populated places are:
 Khunale
 Addi Amyuq (on the boundary to Mahbere Sillasie)
 Miheno
 Tinsehe

Vegetation and exclosures
The tabia holds several exclosures, areas that are set aside for regreening, such as Khunale exclosure. Wood harvesting and livestock range are not allowed there. Besides effects on biodiversity, water infiltration, protection from flooding, sediment deposition, carbon sequestration, people commonly have economic benefits from these exclosures through grass harvesting, beekeeping and other non-timber forest products. The local inhabitants also consider it as “land set aside for future generations”.

Agriculture and livelihood

Agriculture 
The population lives essentially from crop farming, supplemented with off-season work in nearby towns. The land is dominated by farmlands which are clearly demarcated and are cropped every year. Hence the agricultural system is a permanent upland farming system. The farmers have adapted their cropping systems to the spatio-temporal variability in rainfall.

Schools 
Almost all children of the tabia are schooled, though in some schools there is lack of classrooms, directly related to the large intake in primary schools over the last decades. Schools in the tabia include Khunale school.

History and culture

History 
The history of the tabia is strongly confounded with the history of Tembien.

Religion and churches 
Most inhabitants are Orthodox Christians. The following churches are located in the tabia:
 Arba’ite Insesa
 Abune Kiros
 Kidane Mihret, at the foot of, and partly under Tinsehe's waterfall, in a forested cove

Inda Siwa, the local beer houses 
In the main villages, there are traditional beer houses (Inda Siwa), often in unique settings, where people socialise. Well known in the tabia are
  Kindhafti Abadi at Tinsehe
  Genet Gebrehiwet at Tinsehe

Roads and communication 
The main road Mekelle – Hagere Selam – Abiy Addi runs at the southern edge of the tabia. There are regular bus services to these towns. Further, a rural access road links Tinsehe and Addi Werho to the main asphalt road.

Tourism 
Its mountainous nature and proximity to Mekelle make the tabia fit for tourism. As compared to many other mountain areas in Ethiopia the villages are quite accessible, and during walks visitors may be invited for coffee, lunch or even for an overnight stay in a rural homestead.

Touristic attractions 
 Tinsehe waterfall

Geotouristic sites 
The high variability of geological formations and the rugged topography invite for geological and geographic tourism or "geotourism". Geosites in the tabia include:
 Ksad Addi Amyuq roadcut with exposed interbedded lacustrine deposits
 Views from Imba Zuw’ala
 Khunale exclosure
 Phonolite plug at Imba Khoboro
 Church built with phonolite stone in Khunale Arba’ite Insesa
 Meri’a Ziban hill in interbedded lacustrine deposits

Birdwatching 
Birdwatching (for the species, see the main Dogu'a Tembien page) can be done particularly in the tropical forest at the foot of the Tinsehe waterfall.

Trekking routes 

Trekking routes have been established in this tabia. The tracks are not marked on the ground but can be followed using downloaded .GPX files.
 Trek 2, crosses the tabia from north (Khunale) to South (Tinsehe Waterfall)
 Trek 14, from west to east along the upper ridge at the southern side of the tabia	
 Trek 23, from the main road in Miheno, downslope to Addi Idaga

See also 
 Dogu'a Tembien district.

References 

Dogu'a Tembien
Populated places in the Tigray Region